Todd Parr (born July 9, 1962) is an American author, illustrator, animator and television producer. Parr grew up in Rock Springs, Wyoming and later moved to San Francisco in 1995, where he pursued a career as an artist. He has also worked as a flight attendant before becoming a full-time author.

In November 2004, the television show he created, ToddWorld, premiered on TLC and Discovery Kids.

Books

Black & White : Board Book (2001)
BIG & Little : Board Book (2001)
My Really Cool Baby Book (2002)
Going Places (2002)
The Family Book (2003)
This is My Hair (2004)
Reading Makes You Feel Good (2005)
Underwear Do's and Don'ts (2005)
Funny Faces (2009)
It's Okay to Be Different (2001) 
The Feel Good Book (2009)
We Belong Together: A Book about Adoption and Families (2010)
The Earth Book (2010)
The Peace Book (2010)
The I LOVE YOU Book (2010)
Things that Make You Feel Good/Things That Make You Feel Bad (2011)
The Okay Book (2011)
The Daddy Book (2011)
The Grandma Book (2011) 
The Mommy Book (2011)
The Grandpa Book (2011)
Do's and Don'ts (2011)
The I'M NOT SCARED Book (2011)
The Feelings Book (2012)
Zoo Do's and Dont's (2012)
The Underwear Book (2012)
The Thankful Book (2012)
I Love Camp

The Elephant Book
We're Pregnant
We're Parents
Animals In Underwear ABC
Doggy Kisses 123
It's Ok To Make Mistakes (2014)
The Goodbye Book (2015)
Teachers Rock! (2016)
Be Who You Are (2016)
Love The World! (2017)
The Brother Book (2018)
The Sister Book (2018)
The Cars and Trucks Book (2018)
The Don't Worry Book (2019)
The School Book (2019)

Otto books

Otto Goes to the Beach (2003)
Otto Goes to Bed (2003)
Otto Has a Birthday Party (2004)
Otto Goes to Camp (2004)
Otto Goes to School (2005)

ToddWorld

Who's Your Best Friend? (2005)
Welcome to ToddWorld (2005)
The Funny Book of Feelings (2005)
Lights Out, Todd! (2005)
Let's Play Together! (2005)
The Silly Book of Shapes (2006)
It's a Colorful World! (2006)
Giant Book of Friendship Fun! (2006)
I Like Being Me! (2006)
I Love You Just Because (2006)

Awards

Books
2001 National Parenting Publications Award for It's OK to Be Different 
2001 Oppenheim Toy Portfolio Gold Award for The Feelings Book 
2002 Oppenheim Toy Portfolio Gold Awards for The Daddy Book, The Mommy Book, Going Places  
2004 National Parenting Publications Honor Award for Otto Has a Birthday Party
2004 Oppenheim Toy Portfolio Gold Award for The Family Book 
2009 National Parenting Publications Award for The I LOVE YOU Book 
2010 Parents' Choice Award  for The Earth Book 
2011 Green Earth Book Award for The Earth Book 
2012 Family Equality Council Award

Television
iParenting Media Award for ToddWorld
2005 Daytime Emmy Award nomination for ToddWorld 
2005 Humanitas Prize nomination for the ToddWorld episode "Who's Your Best Friend?"

References

External links 
 

American children's writers
American animators
Living people
1962 births
American LGBT writers
LGBT people from Wyoming